Kirtan Sohila (Gurmukhi: ਕੀਰਤਨ ਸੋਹਿਲਾ kīratana sōhilā) is a night prayer in Sikhism. Its name means 'Song of Praise'. It is composed of five hymns or shabad, the first three by Guru Nanak Dev, the fourth by Guru Ram Das and the fifth by Guru Arjan Dev. This hymn is usually recited at the conclusion of evening ceremonies at the Gurdwara and also recited as part of Sikh funeral services. This hymn is also recited before sleeping during bedtime.

References
 English Translation of Kirtan Sohila
 Read Kirtan Sohila in Punjabi
 Read Kirtan Sohila in Hindi
 Read Kirtan Sohila in English

Adi Granth
Sikh kirtan